Gravy Train may refer to:

Film and television
 The Gravy Train, a 1974 American crime-comedy film
 GravyTrain, a 2010 Canadian comedy film
 The Gravy Train (TV series), a British series written by Malcolm Bradbury

Music

Performers
 Gravy Train (band), a 1970s British rock group
 Gravy Train!!!!, a 2000s American electro group
 Kev Gray & The Gravy Train, an alternative pop band formed in 2008

Albums
 Gravy Train (Gravy Train album), 1970
 Gravy Train (Lou Donaldson album), 1962

EPs
 Gravy Train (EP), a 2014 EP by Hoodoo Gurus

Songs
 "Gravy Train", by Mark Knopfler from the single "Darling Pretty", 1996
 "Gravy Train", by Pig from Praise the Lard, 1991
 "Gravy Train", by Samson from Live at Reading '81, 1990
 "Gravy Train", by Snoop Doggy Dogg from Death Row: The Lost Sessions Vol. 1, 2009
 "Gravy Train", by Splinter from The Place I Love, 1974
 "Gravy Train", by Status Quo from In Search of the Fourth Chord, 2007
 "Gravy Train", by UB40 from For the Many, 2019
 "Gravy Train", by Yung Gravy from Sensational, 2019
 "The Gravy Train", by Ian Brown from Music of the Spheres, 2001
 "The Gravy Train", from the stage musical Expresso Bongo, 1958

Other uses
 Gravy Train (dog food), an American dog food brand
 The Gravy Train, a 2003 book by Philip Bushill-Matthews